Qaleh-ye Aqa Hamid (also Romanized as Qal‘eh-ye Āqā Ḩamīd) is a village in Astaneh Rural District, in the Central District of Shazand County, Markazi Province, Iran. At the 2006 census, its population was 1,244, in 329 families.

References 

Populated places in Shazand County